Lambs Grove is a city in Jasper County, Iowa, United States. The population was 174 as of the 2020 Census, down from 225 recorded in 2000.

Geography
Lambs Grove is located at  (41.701199, -93.078282).

There is a small creek that flows through Lambs Grove. Hat Rock Park is located near the center of the town.

History
Lambs Grove was founded in 1927 by E. C. and Jennie Ogg and named after Richard Lamb, Jennie Ogg's father. It was incorporated on December 29, 1952.

On March 5, 2022, an EF4 tornado struck the town, although it was much weaker than it was earlier in its lifetime, damaging multiple homes and facilities.

Demographics

2010 census
As of the census of 2010, there were 172 people, 73 households, and 52 families residing in the city. The racial makeup of the city was 95.9% White, 2.9% from other races, and 1.2% from two or more races. Hispanic or Latino of any race were 2.9% of the population.

There were 73 households, of which 24.7% had children under the age of 18 living with them, 61.6% were married couples living together, 6.8% had a female householder with no husband present, 2.7% had a male householder with no wife present, and 28.8% were non-families. 26.0% of all households were made up of individuals, and 15.1% had someone living alone who was 65 years of age or older. The average household size was 2.36 and the average family size was 2.87.

The median age in the city was 47.5 years. 20.3% of residents were under the age of 18; 5.3% were between the ages of 18 and 24; 21% were from 25 to 44; 33.1% were from 45 to 64; and 20.3% were 65 years of age or older. The gender makeup of the city was 48.8% male and 51.2% female.

2000 census
As of the census of 2000, there were 225 people, 80 households, and 68 families residing in the city. The racial makeup of the city was 97.78% White and 2.22% Asian. Hispanic or Latino of any race were 0.44% of the population.

There were 80 households, out of which 40.0% had children under the age of 18 living with them, 73.8% were married couples living together, 7.5% had a female householder with no husband present, and 15.0% were non-families. 12.5% of all households were made up of individuals, and 3.8% had someone living alone who was 65 years of age or older. The average household size was 2.81 and the average family size was 3.06.

In the city, the population was spread out, with 26.2% under the age of 18, 8.4% from 18 to 24, 23.1% from 25 to 44, 30.2% from 45 to 64, and 12.0% who were 65 years of age or older. The median age was 41 years. For every 100 females, there were 97.4 males. For every 100 females age 18 and over, there were 88.6 males.

The median income for a household in the city was $56,000, and the median income for a family was $65,417. Males had a median income of $45,000 versus $28,750 for females. The per capita income for the city was $20,923. About 6.2% of families and 5.6% of the population were below the poverty line, including 12.0% of those under the age of eighteen and none of those 65 or over.

References

Cities in Iowa
Cities in Jasper County, Iowa
Populated places established in 1927
1927 establishments in Iowa